Madame's Place is an American sitcom based on the ribald, acerbic, aging-celebrity diva Madame, a puppet character portrayed by Wayland Flowers.  Madame's Place was produced for one season with 51 (numbered but untitled) episodes, originally aired between September 1982 and February 1983. The series was produced for first-run syndication, where it aired five days a week.

The theme song for the show was composed by Michael Miller, with lyrics by Monica Riordan.

Background
The creation of puppeteer Wayland Flowers, the "outrageous old broad" character of Madame had gained a following in the 1970s for humorous double entendres, wisecrack comebacks, and celebrity name-dropping.  Madame was often costumed in fabulous gowns and summer diamonds ("some are diamonds; some are not"), a style spoofing the glamour of Hollywood's Golden era.

Premise
Madame lives in a plush Hollywood mansion surrounded by devoted butler Pinkerton, attentive secretary Bernadette, and beautiful niece Sara Joy.  The domestic comedy antics of Madame's household are supplemented by Madame's eponymous talk show within-the-show, a revolving door for stand-up comedy, variety show performers, and celebrity guests.

As the series opens, the popular Madame's Place talk show has long been broadcasting reruns, prompting her fans to demand new episodes.  Madame successfully negotiates a revival of the show from her home studio.

Cast and characters
 Wayland Flowers as Madame
 Johnny Haymer as butler Walter Pinkerton
 Susan Tolsky as secretary Bernadette Van Gilder
 Judy Landers as niece Sara Joy Pitts

Recurring
 Corey Feldman as kid neighbor Buzzy St. James
 Ty Henderson as television producer Barney Wolfe
 Edie McClurg as psychic medium Solaria

Featured interviews and performers 
 Guests were frequent and ranged widely, often appearing as themselves; notables include Peggy Gilbert, Debbie Reynolds, Betty White, Phyllis Diller, Tab Hunter, William Shatner, Charles Nelson Reilly, Rip Taylor, Charles Pierce, Frankie Avalon, Marty Allen, Pee-wee Herman, Bea Arthur and Arsenio Hall.

References

External links

1982 American television series debuts
1983 American television series endings
1980s American sitcoms
English-language television shows
First-run syndicated television programs in the United States
American television shows featuring puppetry
Television series by CBS Studios